The Traduction œcuménique de la Bible (abr.: TOB; full name: La Bible : traduction œcuménique) is a French ecumenical translation of the Bible, first made in 1975-1976 by Catholics and Protestants.

The project was initiated by Dominicans, and took the form of a revision of the Jerusalem Bible (Bible de Jérusalem). The TOB is published by the Éditions du Cerf and United Bible Societies.

Unlike the Jerusalem Bible, the TOB did not receive an imprimatur.

Editions

1975 edition 
There was some participation by Eastern Orthodox Christians, but the effect on the 1975 edition was limited, given that the translation of the Old Testament was based on the Hebrew text rather than on the Septuagint.

1988 edition 
A first update resulted in the 1988 edition, incorporating comments and suggestions from readers and harmonizing the translation of certain words or parallel passages.

2004 edition 
In 2004, a new edition was published, containing general introductions for each of the 73 books.

2010 edition 
The launch of the TOB 2010 edition was an editorial and ecumenical event, as it contains six additional deuterocanonical books in use in the liturgy of the Orthodox Churches: 3 and 4 Ezra, 3 and 4 Maccabees, the Prayer of Manasseh and Psalm 151.

See also 
 Common English Bible
 Bible
 Exegesis
 Bible translations
 Bible translations (French)

References

External links 
 
 
 

Bible translations into French
1976 non-fiction books
1976 in Christianity
Catholic–Protestant ecumenism